The Nicoya Peninsula is a peninsula on the Pacific coast of Costa Rica. It is divided into two provinces: Guanacaste Province in the north, and the Puntarenas Province in the south. It is known for its beaches and is a popular tourist destination.

The main transport and commercial centre in the region is Nicoya, one of the oldest settlements in Costa Rica. Ferries run between the town of Puntarenas on the mainland and the Nicoya Peninsula. There is an international airport in nearby Liberia and small domestic airstrips in Nosara, Carrillo, Tamarindo and Tambor. The region was also featured in the book Blue Zones, by Dan Buettner, which focused on the longevity found among Nicoya's residents.

Places of interest
Other notable settlements and places of interest in the area include (going roughly from north to south): Tamarindo, Santa Cruz, Nosara, Sámara, Naranjo, Paquera, Curu, Tambor, Montezuma, Santa Teresa, Mal Pais.

The Ostional Wildlife Refuge is the second largest beach where the turtles come to nest. One of their biggest nesting years had over 500,000 females come ashore to nest in one season. This refuge works in with the Nancite beach at Santa Rosa National Park. These two protected areas are two of the most important areas for the nesting of Olive Ridley turtles (Lepidochelys olivacea). Two other common species of turtles that nest here are the leatherback turtles (Dermmochelys coriacea) and the Pacific green turtle (Chelonia mydas agassizii). The nesting generally occurs for three to five days.

Conservation
There are a number of nature reserves and wildlife refuges such as Cabo Blanco, Camaronal, Cueva Murciélago, Curú, La Ceiba, Romelia and the Diriá National Park, as well as the projects on the islands of the adjacent Gulf of Nicoya.

Notable features
The Nicoya Peninsula is considered by Quest Network one of the Blue Zones in the world, where people commonly live active lives past the age of 100 years.

See also
Tourism in Costa Rica

References

Peninsulas of Costa Rica
Geography of Guanacaste Province
Geography of Puntarenas Province
Blue zones